Zsigmond Nagy (27 July 1937 in Csengőd – 1 March 2010 in Budapest) was a Hungarian shot putter who competed in the 1960 Summer Olympics and in the 1964 Summer Olympics. Nagy held the record for combined left and right hand shot put with total distance of 104 feet 11 inches until it was broken by Parry O'Brien in 1962.

References

1937 births
2010 deaths
Hungarian male shot putters
Olympic athletes of Hungary
Athletes (track and field) at the 1960 Summer Olympics
Athletes (track and field) at the 1964 Summer Olympics
Universiade medalists in athletics (track and field)
Sportspeople from Bács-Kiskun County
Universiade gold medalists for Hungary
Medalists at the 1959 Summer Universiade
Medalists at the 1961 Summer Universiade
Medalists at the 1963 Summer Universiade
20th-century Hungarian people
21st-century Hungarian people